Aristede Dejoie (died 1917) was a businessman and state legislator in Louisiana. He served as a member of the Louisiana House of Representatives from 1872 to 1874 and 1877 to 1879.

He also served as a tax assessor. He and T. B. Stamps asserted their civil rights by purchasing tickets to the dress circle at the Saint Charles Theater in New Orleans in 1875. He was secretary if the Cosmopolitan Insurance Association.

Personal life 
Dejoie was the father of Paul Dejoie and C.C. Dejoie. He also was a Republican in the era of progressivism and pro-Black sentiment within the party during and after Reconstruction.

In his political career he represented New Orleans, where he opened a bakery and eatery. He was a leader in the local affiliate of the National Negro Business League and helped lead Unity Life Insurance with his sons to become an influential firm despite facing discrimination.

See also
African-American officeholders during and following the Reconstruction era

References

1917 deaths
Members of the Louisiana House of Representatives
Year of birth missing
African-American state legislators in Louisiana